Snecked masonry has a mixture of roughly squared stones of different sizes. It is laid in horizontal courses with rising stones projecting through the courses of smaller stones. Yet smaller fillers called snecks also occur in the courses.  The mixture of stone sizes produces a strong bond and an attractive finish. Large amounts of planning for bricklaying process should be considered, as the corners cannot mould perfectly into every size stone. Additional stonecutting and on-the-scene stonecrafting skills may be required.

References 

Masonry
Building materials
Stonemasonry
Building stone